Chelsea Lewis (born 24 November 1993) is a Wales netball international. She represented Wales at the 2011 and 2015 Netball World Cups and at the 2014 and 2018 Commonwealth Games. She was also a member of the Wales teams that won the 2010 Netball Singapore Nations Cup and the 2013 and 2014 European Netball Championships. At club level she has played for Celtic Dragons and  
Team Bath in the Netball Superleague.

Early life and education
Lewis is originally from Aberdare. She was educated at Aberdare Girls' School, where she first began to play netball, Neath Port Talbot College and Cardiff Metropolitan University.

Playing career

Celtic Dragons
Lewis first played for Celtic Dragons between 2010 and 2015. She was a member of the Dragons squad that finished as runners up to Team Bath in the 2013 Netball Superleague. She guested for Dragons when they played as Celtic Flames in the 2017 Netball New Zealand Super Club. After three seasons with Team Bath, Lewis re-joined Dragons for the 2019 season. She withdrew from the 2020 Dragons squad after announcing her pregnancy.

Netball Waitakere
In 2015 Lewis played for Netball Waitakere in New Zealand.

Team Bath
Lewis played for Team Bath during the 2016, 2017 and 2018 seasons.

Wales
Lewis made her senior debut for Wales in 2010 during a  qualifying tournament for the 2011 World Netball Championships. She was the 190th Wales international and, at the age of 16, she was also the youngest. She was subsequently a member of the Wales team that won the 2010 Netball Singapore Nations Cup. She was also a member of the Wales teams that won the 2013 and 2014 European Netball Championships. Lewis also represented Wales at the 2011 and 2015 Netball World Cups and at the 2014 and 2018 Commonwealth Games.

Lewis made her 50th senior appearance for Wales in a match against Uganda during the 2015 Netball World Cup. Aged 21 years, 7 months and 23 days, she became the youngest Wales international to gain 50 senior caps. At the same tournament she scored 232 for Wales and helped them finish in seventh place, their best finish since 1991.

Personal life and employment
Lewis is in a relationship with Adam Beard, the Wales rugby union international. She coaches netball at Monmouth School for Girls

Honours
Wales
European Netball Championship
Winners: 2013, 2014: 2
Runners Up: 2016, 2019 : 2
Netball Singapore Nations Cup
Winners: 2010: 1
Celtic Dragons
Netball Superleague
Runners Up: 2013: 1

References

1993 births
Living people
Welsh netball players
Netball Superleague players
Celtic Dragons players
Team Bath netball players
Netball players at the 2014 Commonwealth Games
Netball players at the 2018 Commonwealth Games
Netball coaches
Commonwealth Games competitors for Wales
Alumni of Cardiff Metropolitan University
Sportspeople from Aberdare
Sportspeople from Merthyr Tydfil
British expatriate sportspeople in New Zealand
2011 World Netball Championships players